Mohammed Ishaq Tokhi is a politician from Afghanistan who served as a vice president of Afghanistan.

References 

Vice presidents of Afghanistan